Hero in the Shadows, published in 2000, is a novel by British fantasy writer David Gemmell. It is the third of three Waylander stories and was preceded by Waylander II: In the Realm of the Wolf.

Characters

Waylander (The Grey Man), 
Keeva, 
Yu Yu Liang (Pria-shath), 
Kysumu, 
Eldicar Manushan, 
Ustarte, 
Niallad,

Plot summary

Waylander, the assassin anti-hero of Waylander and Waylander II, is now a rich old man looking for a world that will give him peace and atonement for his crimes. However, his relatively quiet peace is broken by the appearance of old demons from the past, and enemies from the present. Faced with enemies he cannot easily fight, even a magical sorcerer working for an unknown cause, he is forced to take up his crossbow and sabre to once again become Waylander. Aided by an idealistic warrior, a braggart with a stolen sword, a girl with a special talent, and a mysterious priestess and her followers, he seeks to close the chapter of his life by destroying the evil he has created by his own hand.

2000 British novels
British fantasy novels
Drenai
Novels by David Gemmell
Bantam Books books